Miljana Border Bridge is a bridge over the Sutla River, between Croatia and Slovenia.

It was built in 2012 and opened on 11 July by Croatian and Slovene ministers of infrastructure, Siniša Hajdaš Dončić and Zvonko Černač.

References 

Bridges in Croatia
Road bridges in Slovenia
Bridges completed in 2012
Croatia–Slovenia border crossings
Buildings and structures in Krapina-Zagorje County